The white-throated greenbul (Phyllastrephus albigularis), or white-throated bulbul, is a species of songbird in the bulbul family, Pycnonotidae.
It is found in many parts of central and western Africa.  Its natural habitats are subtropical or tropical moist lowland forests and subtropical or tropical moist montane forests.

Taxonomy and systematics
The white-throated greenbul was originally described in the genus Xenocichla (a synonym for Bleda). The alternate name, 'white-throated bulbul', should not be confused with the species of the same name, Alophoixus flaveolus.

Subspecies
Two subspecies are recognized:
 Bamenda white-throated greenbul (P. a. albigularis) - (Sharpe, 1881): Found from Senegal and Gambia to southern Sudan, western Uganda and eastern Democratic Republic of Congo
 Angola greenbul (P. a. viridiceps) - Rand, 1955: Formerly considered as a separate species. Found in north-western Angola

References

white-throated greenbul
Birds of Sub-Saharan Africa
white-throated greenbul
Taxonomy articles created by Polbot